Stefan Tadeusz Aleksander Bratkowski (22 November 1934 – 18 April 2021) was a Polish journalist and writer. He was an opposition activist during the Polish People's Republic.

References

1934 births
2021 deaths
Polish journalists
Polish writers
Polish democracy activists
Jagiellonian University alumni
People from Wrocław